You Only Loved Me Twice is a crime drama short film directed by award-winning director Ryan Pickett, which along with a business proposal helped him become a top 5 finalist in the showcase event in the US for Global Entrepreneurship Week film entrepreneurship competition The Race to BE hosted by media mogul Russell Simmons at Sony Picture Studios in Los Angeles. You Only Loved Me Twice currently has distribution with IndieFlix online video streaming service.

Plot 
You Only Loved Me Twice is a silent film that shows the way deception can be deadly. Wife Amy Miller (Michelle Evans) is preparing a romantic meal for her husband with flowers and wine. Amy has a perturbed look on her face, which the audience realizes is because she has recently stumbled upon photos of her husband Ray Miller (Matt Bolton) with a young sassy blonde Lisa Hewitt (Jennifer Bonior). When Ray comes home, he brings flowers perhaps to make up for a fight the couple recently had. The couple begins to eat in silence until Ray drops his glass of wine. Amy is in the middle of aiming a gun she has taped under the table. Ray and Amy are cleaning the wine when he sees the gun. The couple begins a choreographed tango. Ray reaches for the gun and he shoots Amy, while his next move is to wait for Lisa to join him.

Cast 
The cast of You Only Loved Me Twice includes Michelle Evans, Matt Bolton and Jennifer Bonior.

Production 
You Only Loved Me Twice was written, produced, edited and directed by Ryan Pickett. Justin Eslinger was the cinematographer, while Andrew Stockton was the choreographer.

Interviews 
In an interview with Nashville Business Journal, Ryan says You Only Loved Me Twice is "a beginning film, but I did decide to go over the top with it."

The Entertainment Corner interviewed Ryan and asked, "Your first film You Only Loved Me Twice earned you a top five spot in film entrepreneurship competition The Race to BE hosted by media mogul Russell Simmons. Please share with us what that experience was like and how it has changed your filmmaking career?" Ryan responded, "I appreciated being recognized for my craft and it made me work even harder."

Reviews 
Critic Matthew Saliba of Rogue Cinema says, "The visual aesthetic of the film is quite something and very reminiscent of David Lynch's "Lost Highway." The editing and the pacing of the piece is spot-on making the 8 minutes go by quickly. Performances are equally strong with all the right emotions being conveyed, which given the lack of dialogue is no easy task."

Critic Brian Skutle of Sonic Cinema says, "Pickett uses a visual and musical style that brings to mind David Lynch, but while presenting a story that feels more straightforward than anything Lynch has done. It’s riveting stuff, especially when we’re watching the husband and wife do one last tango together."

References

External links
 Ryan Pickett Productions
 
 You Only Loved Me Twice on IndieFlix

2008 crime drama films
American crime drama films
2008 films
2000s English-language films
2000s American films